Never Say Never may refer to:

Music 
 Never Say Never Festival, an annual music festival in Texas, U.S.

Albums 
 Never Say Never (Alias album), 2009
 Never Say Never (Brandy Norwood album), 1998
 Never Say Never (Ian McLagan album), 2008
 Never Say Never (Kim Wilde album), 2006
 Never Say Never (Melba Moore album), 1983
 Never Say Never: The First 20 Years, a 2001 box set by The Choir
 Never Say Never: The Remixes, a 2011 album by Justin Bieber
 Never Say Never (EP), a 1982 EP by Romeo Void

Songs 
 A musical number from the 1986 animated film, An American Tail
 "Never Say Never" (Armin van Buuren song), 2009
 "Never Say Never" (Basement Jaxx song), 2014
 "Never Say Never" (Brandy Norwood song), 1998
 "Never Say Never" (Cole Swindell and Lainey Wilson song), 2021
 "Never Say Never" (Justin Bieber song), 2010
 "Never Say Never" (Romeo Void song), 1982, covered by Queens of the Stone Age
 "Never Say Never" (T. Graham Brown song), 1989
 "Never Say Never" (The Fray song), 2009
 "Never Say Never" (Vandalism song), 2006
 ""Never Say Never" (Danganronpa song), the opening theme of the 2013 anime Danganronpa: The Animation
 "Never Say Never", by Jennifer Rush from the self-titled album, 1992
 "Never Say Never", by Lisette Melendez from Together Forever, 1991
 "Never Say Never", by Overkill from Under the Influence
 "Never Say Never", by Styx from Cornerstone, 1979
 "Never Say Never", by Triumph from Surveillance, 1987
 "Never Say Never", by that dog. from Retreat from the Sun, 1997
 "Never Say Never", by Thundamentals from Everyone We Know, 2017
 "Never Say Never", by Vixen from Tangerine, 1998
 "Never Say Never", by KMFDM from Blitz, 2009
 "Never Say Never", by Mr Big from Lean Into It, 1991
 "All Stand Up (Never Say Never)", by Status Quo from Heavy Traffic
 "Never Say Never", by Olivia Addams, 2022

Film 
 Justin Bieber: Never Say Never,  2011 documentary film
 Never Say Never, a 1994 pornographic film by Harold Lime

Other uses 
MLW Never Say Never, a Major League Wrestling event
Never Say Never (2019)
Never Say Never (2021)

See also 
 Never Say Never Again, a 1983 James Bond film